Interferon-gamma release assays (IGRAs) are diagnostic tools for latent tuberculosis infection (LTBI). They are surrogate markers of Mycobacterium tuberculosis infection and indicate a cellular immune response to M. tuberculosis if the latter is present.

Active vs latent tuberculosis 

IGRAs cannot distinguish between latent infection and active tuberculosis (TB) disease, and should not be used as a sole method for diagnosis of active TB, which is a microbiological diagnosis. A positive IGRA result may not necessarily indicate TB infection, but can also be caused by infection with non-tuberculous mycobacteria. A negative IGRA does not rule out active TB disease; a number of studies have shown that up to a quarter of patients with active TB have negative IGRA results.

BCG Status 
Because IGRAs are not affected by Bacille Calmette–Guérin (BCG) vaccination status, IGRAs are useful for evaluation of LTBI in BCG-vaccinated individuals, particularly in settings where BCG vaccination is administered after infancy or multiple (booster) BCG vaccinations are given. In contrast, the specificity of tuberculin skin test (TST) varies depending on timing of BCG and whether repeated (booster) vaccinations are given.

Commercial IGRA test 
QuantiFERON, also known as QFT, is the registered trademark of an interferon gamma release assay (IGRA) for tuberculosis diagnosis manufactured by QIAGEN. The QFT-GIT assay is an ELISA-based, whole-blood test that uses peptides from three TB antigens (ESAT-6, CFP-10, and TB7.7) in an in-tube format. The result is reported as quantification of IFN-gamma in international units (IU) per mL. An individual is considered positive for M. tuberculosis infection if the IFN-gamma response to TB antigens is above the test cut-off (after subtracting the background IFN-gamma response in the negative control).

Mantoux vs IGRA test 
Since IGRAs are more costly and technically complex to do than the Mantoux test, in their 2011 policy statement, the WHO did not recommend replacing the Mantoux test by IGRAs as a public health intervention in low- and middle-income countries.

QuantiFERON-TB (QFT) 
QuantiFERON-TB Gold In-Tube (QFT-GIT), the third generation test, has replaced QuantiFERON-TB (QFT) and QuantiFERON-Gold, which are no longer marketed.

According to the U.S. Centers for Disease Control, in 2001, the QuantiFERON-TB test (QFT) was approved by the Food and Drug Administration (FDA) as an aid for detecting latent Mycobacterium tuberculosis infection. This test is an in vitro diagnostic aid that measures a component of cell-mediated immune reactivity to M. tuberculosis. The test is based on the quantification of interferon-gamma (IFN-γ) released from sensitized lymphocytes in whole blood incubated overnight with purified protein derivative (PPD) from M. tuberculosis and control antigens.

Tuberculin skin testing (TST) has been used for years as an aid in diagnosing latent tuberculosis infection (LTBI) and includes measurement of the delayed type hypersensitivity response 48–72 hours after intradermal injection of PPD. TST and QFT do not measure the same components of the immunologic response and are not interchangeable. Assessment of the accuracy of these tests is limited by lack of a standard for confirming LTBI.

As a diagnostic test, QFT:
 requires phlebotomy
 can be accomplished after a single patient visit
 assesses responses to multiple antigens simultaneously
 does not boost anamnestic immune responses (see Latent tuberculosis#Boosting).

Compared with TST, QFT results are less subject to reader bias and error. In a CDC-sponsored multicenter trial, QFT and TST results were moderately concordant (overall kappa value = 0.60). The level of concordance was adversely affected by prior bacille Calmette-Guérin (BCG) vaccination, immune reactivity to nontuberculous mycobacteria (NTM), and a prior positive TST. In addition to the multicenter study, two other published studies have demonstrated moderate concordance between TST and QFT. However, one of the five sites involved in the CDC study reported less agreement. Although there have been studies confirming the increased future risk of active TB in individuals with positive TST, the same was not true for those with a positive IGRA result. A recently published study demonstrated that a positive IGRA result is predictive of future active TB risk. Moreover, IGRA was at least as sensitive and was more specific compared to traditional TST. In this study of immunocompetent recently exposed close contacts of active TB cases, the progression rate to active disease among untreated QFT positive individuals was significantly greater than for untreated TST positives (14.6% versus 2.3%). Although the numbers were small, all of the close contacts who went on to develop active TB were QFT positive, but only 83% were TST positive.

As noted above, prior BCG vaccination can produce false positive TST results. In a study of military personnel returning from missions, about one-half of the positive TSTs were falsely positive. In a more recent study of military returning from missions, Franken et al. reported evidence suggesting false positive TST results are common and that QFT testing could guide more targeted treatment and alleviate unnecessary anti-tuberculous treatment.

The FDA's cutpoint for a positive result was established at >0.34 International Units/millilitre (IU/ml), though this has proven functionally problematic in low prevalence areas, such as among US and Canadian healthcare workers. In areas of low risk and low prevalence, the positive predictive value of any test is diminished. In the case of serially screened North American healthcare workers, QFT results just above this cutpoint produce false-positive test results that upon repeat testing revert to negative, where tuberculosis screening is often mandated on an annual basis. Research at Stanford University and the Veterans Administration has reported the use of a retesting (or borderline) zone below 1.1 IU/ml mitigates 76% of the false-positives, or reversions.

Limitations of QFT include the need to draw blood and process it within 16 hours after collection and limited laboratory and clinical experience with the assay. There is need for further study of the utility of QFT in predicting the progression to active tuberculosis, particularly in children and immunocompromised hosts.

To its disadvantage, QFT can yield false positive results with Mycobacterium szulgai, Mycobacterium kansasii, and Mycobacterium marinum.

QuantiFERON-TB Gold 
The QuantiFERON-TB Gold test (QFT-G) is a whole-blood test for use as an aid in diagnosing Mycobacterium tuberculosis infection, including latent tuberculosis infection (LTBI) and tuberculosis (TB) disease. This test was approved by the U.S. Food and Drug Administration (FDA) in 2005.

Blood samples are mixed with antigens (substances that can produce an immune response) and controls. For QFT-G, the antigens include mixtures of synthetic peptides representing two M. tuberculosis proteins, ESAT-6 and CFP-10. After incubation of the blood with antigens for 16 to 24 hours, the amount of interferon-gamma (IFN-gamma) is measured.

If the patient is infected with M. tuberculosis, their white blood cells will release IFN-gamma in response to contact with the TB antigens. The QFT-G results are based on the amount of IFN-gamma that is released in response to the antigens.

Clinical evaluation and additional tests (such as a chest radiograph, sputum smear, and culture) are needed to differentiate between a diagnosis of latent TB or active TB.

Advantages of the test are:
 Requires a single patient visit to draw a blood sample.
 Results can be available within 24 hours.
 Does not boost responses measured by subsequent tests, which can happen with tuberculin skin tests (TST).
 Is not subject to reader bias that can occur with TST.
 Is not affected by prior BCG (bacille Calmette-Guérin) vaccination.

Disadvantages and limitations of the test are:
 Blood samples must be processed within 16 hours after collection while white blood cells are still viable.
 There is limited data on the use of QFT-G in children younger than 17 years of age, among persons recently exposed to M. tuberculosis, and in immunocompromised persons (e.g., impaired immune function caused by HIV infection or acquired immunodeficiency syndrome [AIDS], current treatment with immunosuppressive drugs, selected hematological disorders, specific malignancies, diabetes, silicosis, and chronic kidney failure).
 Errors in collecting or transporting blood specimens or in running and interpreting the assay can decrease the accuracy of QFT-G.
 Variability, a big issue that influences the result adversely. More automation will be needed to accurately measure the QFT response.
 Limited data on the use of QFT-G to determine who is at risk for developing TB disease.

QuantiFERON-TB Gold In-Tube 
On 10/10/2007 the US FDA gave approval for the Quantiferon TB Gold In Tube to be marketed in the US

The FDA states: Approval for a modification of the quantiferon-tb gold to an in-tube collection system that consists of three blood collection tubes, nil, tb antigen, and mitogen. The device, as modified, will be marketed under the trade name quantiferon-tb gold in-tube and is indicated for use as an in vitro diagnostic test using a peptide cocktail simulating esat-6, cfp-10 and tb 7.7(p4) proteins to stimulate cells in heparinized whole blood drawn directly into specialized blood collection tubes. Detection of interferon-y by enzyme-linked immunosorbent assay (elisa) is used to identify in vitro responses to these peptide antigens that are associated with mycobacterium tuberculosis infection.

According to the FDA approved package insert Quantiferon TB Gold In Tube has a consistent specificity of >99% in low risk individuals and a sensitivity as high as 92% in individuals with active disease, depending on setting and extent of disease. The specificity in two studies of a few hundred people is 96-98% in a health immunised population.

The package insert also advises that the kit provides three collection tubes which have had antigens dried onto their walls and that these tubes must be transferred to an incubator within 16 hours of blood collection.

On 25 June 2010, the US Centers for Disease Control and Prevention (CDC) updated the tuberculosis (TB) testing guidelines providing guidance to US public health officials, clinicians, and laboratory workers regarding screening for and diagnosis of TB infection. The updated guidelines provide new direction for TB control in the US.

Previously, QuantiFERON®-TB Gold was able to be used in any situation in which the Tuberculin Skin Test (TST) was used, without preference. The 2010 guidelines establish a new benchmark because they recommend IGRAs as the preferred TB testing method in many patients, including those who are BCG vaccinated or are unlikely to return for TST reading.

Availability
In the United States, the test is widely available from state public health laboratories, hospitals, and commercial laboratories.

In January 2008 the CDC advised - via their TB Notes Newsletter - TB controllers and others of a link to a list of laboratories in the US and Canada offering to perform the Quantiferon Gold test.

The California Tuberculosis Controllers Association have also provided a list of public health laboratories in California that are testing with Quantiferon.

References 

Tuberculosis